Ferrel may refer to:

People
 Leonardo Ferrel (1923–?), Bolivian footballer
 William Ferrel (1817–1891), American meteorologist 
 Ferrel Harris (1940–2000), American race car driver
 Beacher Ferrel Hackney (1950–2009?), American suspected murderer

Places
 Ferrel (Peniche), a seaside parish in Peniche, Portugal
 Ferrel Seamount, a seamount in the Pacific Ocean

Ships
 NOAAS Ferrel (S 492), an American survey ship 1968-2002

See also
 Ferrell (disambiguation)
 Ferrol (disambiguation)